The Billboard Global 200 is a chart that ranks the best-performing songs globally. Its data, published by Billboard magazine and compiled by MRC Data, is based on digital sales and online streaming from over 200 territories worldwide. Another similar chart is the Billboard Global Excl. US chart, which follows the same formula except it covers all territories excluding the US.

On the Global 200, fourteen singles reached number one in 2021. In addition, two other number-one singles, "All I Want for Christmas Is You" by Mariah Carey and "Dynamite" by BTS, had each previously hit number one in 2020. Sixteen artists reached the top of the chart, with thirteen—Olivia Rodrigo, Drake, Rosé, Justin Bieber, Daniel Caesar, Giveon, Lil Nas X, The Weeknd, Ed Sheeran, the Kid Laroi, Coldplay, Adele, and Taylor Swift—achieving their first number-one single. BTS scored three number-one singles while Rodrigo and Bieber scored two each, as the only acts to achieve multiple number-one songs in 2021. Olivia Rodrigo spent the most weeks at the top spot with 14 non-consecutive weeks at number one, while "Stay" by Justin Bieber and the Kid Laroi is the longest reigning number-one song with 11 weeks atop the chart. 

On the Global Excl. US, eleven singles reached number one in 2021. In addition, two other number-one singles, "All I Want for Christmas Is You" by Mariah Carey and "Dynamite" by BTS, had each previously hit number one in 2020. Thirteen artists reached the top of the chart, with eleven—Olivia Rodrigo, Rosé, Justin Bieber, Daniel Caesar, Giveon, Lil Nas X, Ed Sheeran, the Kid Laroi, Coldplay, Adele, and Taylor Swift—achieving their first number-one single. BTS scored three number-one singles while Justin Bieber scored two, as the only acts to achieve multiple number-one songs in 2021. Bieber also spent the most weeks at the top spot with 14 non-consecutive weeks at number one. Bieber and the Kid Laroi's song "Stay" is tied with Olivia Rodrigo's "Drivers License" as the longest reigning number-one song of 2021, each with nine weeks atop the chart.

Chart history

See also 
 2021 in music
 List of Billboard 200 number-one albums of 2021
 List of Billboard Hot 100 number ones of 2021
 Billboard Year-End Global 200 singles of 2021

References

Global 200
2021